Multi-memory controllers or memory management controllers (MMC) are different kinds of special chips designed by various video game developers for use in Nintendo Entertainment System (NES) cartridges. These chips extend the capabilities of the original console and make it possible to create NES games with features the original console cannot offer alone. The basic NES hardware supports only 40KB of ROM total, up to 32KB PRG and 8KB CHR, thus only a single tile and sprite table are possible. This limit was rapidly reached within the Famicom's first two years on the market and game developers began requesting a way to expand the console's capabilities.

In the emulation community these chips are also known as mappers.

List of MMC chips

CNROM
 Manufacturer: Nintendo
 Games: Gradius, Ghostbusters, Gyruss, Arkanoid

CNROM is the earliest banking hardware introduced on the Famicom, appearing in early 1986. It consists of a single 7400 series discrete logic chip. CNROM supports a single fixed PRG bank and up to eight CHR banks for 96KB total ROM. Some third party variations supported additional capabilities. Many CNROM games store the game level data in the CHR ROM and blank the screen while reading it.

UNROM
 Manufacturer: Nintendo
 Games: Pro Wrestling, Ikari Warriors, Mega Man, Contra, Castlevania

Early NES mappers are composed of 7400 series discrete logic chips. UNROM appeared in late 1986. It supports a single fixed 16KB PRG bank, the rest of the PRG being switchable. Instead of a dedicated ROM chip to hold graphics data (called CHR by Nintendo), games using UNROM store graphics data on the program ROM and copy it to a RAM on the cartridge at run time.

MMC1

 Manufacturer: Nintendo
 Games: The Legend of Zelda, Mega Man 2, Metroid, Godzilla: Monster of Monsters, Teenage Mutant Ninja Turtles, and more.
The MMC1 is Nintendo's first custom MMC integrated circuit to incorporate support for saved games and multi-directional scrolling configurations.
The chip comes in at least five different versions: MMC1A, MMC1B1, MMC1B2, MMC1B3 and MMC1C. The differences between the different versions are slight, mostly owing to savegame memory protection behavior. The MMC1 chip allows for switching of different memory banks. Program ROM can be selected in 16KB or 32KB chunks, and character ROM can be selected in 4KB or 8KB chunks. An unusual feature of this memory controller is that its input is serial, rather than parallel, so 5 sequential writes (with bit shifting) are needed to send a command to the circuit.

MMC2
 Manufacturer: Nintendo
 Games: Mike Tyson's Punch-Out!!
The MMC2 is only used in  Mike Tyson's Punch-Out!! and the later rerelease which replaced Mike Tyson. A single 8KB bank of program ROM can be selected (with the remaining 24KB locked) and character ROM can be selected in two pairs of 4KB banks, which would be automatically switched when the video hardware attempts to load particular graphic tiles from memory, thus allowing a larger amount of graphics to be used on the screen without the need for the game itself to manually switch them.

MMC3

 Manufacturer: Nintendo
 Games: Mega Man 3, 4, 5, 6, Super Mario Bros. 2NA/EU, Super Mario Bros. 3, Kirby's Adventure, and more.
The MMC3 was introduced in 1988. It adds an IRQ timer to allow split screen scrolling without the sacrifice of sprite 0, along with two selectable 8KB program ROM banks and two 2KB+four 1KB selectable character ROM banks, which allows easy instant swapping of sprite and tile data. 8KB of save game RAM is supported.

MMC4
 Manufacturer: Nintendo
 Games: Fire Emblem, Fire Emblem Gaiden, and Famicom Wars
This chip is only used in three games, all of which were released only for the Famicom in Japan, and were developed by Intelligent Systems. Functionally, it is nearly identical to the MMC2, with the only difference being that the MMC4 switches program ROM in 16KB banks instead of 8KB banks and has support for a battery-backed SRAM to save game data.

MMC5
 Manufacturer: Nintendo
 Games: Castlevania III: Dracula's CurseNA/EU, Just Breed, Metal Slader Glory, Laser Invasion, Uchuu Keibitai SDF, Nobunaga's Ambition II, Nobunaga no Yabou - Sengoku Gunyuu Den, Bandit Kings of Ancient China, Romance of the Three Kingdoms II, Uncharted Waters, Genghis Khan II: Clan of the Gray Wolf, Gemfire, L'Empereur, Ishin no Arashi, Shin 4 Nin Uchi Mahjong - Yakuman Tengoku, Rockman 4 Minus Infinity

The MMC5 is Nintendo's most advanced MMC. It was originally also the most expensive. Only Koei used this chip regularly. It is similar to Konami's VRC6, but interrupt handling works differently. The chip has 1KB of extra RAM, two extra square wave sound channels, one extra PCM sound channel, support for vertical split screen scrolling, improved graphics capabilities (making 16,384 different tiles available per screen rather than only 256, and allowing each individual 8x8-pixel background tile to have its own color assignment instead of being restricted to one color set per 2x2 tile group), highly configurable program ROM and character ROM bank switching, and a scanline-based IRQ counter. The MMC5 supports up to 2MB total ROM, however no commercially released game exceeded 1MB.

MMC6
 Manufacturer: Nintendo
 Games: StarTropics, Zoda's Revenge: StarTropics II
The MMC6 is similar to the MMC3, with an additional 1 KB of RAM which can be saved with battery backup.

Famicom Disk System
 Manufacturer: Nintendo
 Games: Akumajo Dracula, Arumana no Kiseki, Ai Senshi Nicol, Big Challenge! Dogfight Spirit, Bio Miracle Bokutte Upa, CrackoutJP, Double DribbleJP, Dracula II, Falsion, Famicom Tantei Club Part II: Ushiro ni Tatsu Shōjo, Kid IcarusJP, KiKi KaiKai, Meikyuu Jiin Dababa, MetroidJP, Pro WrestlingJP, Relics - Ankoku Yousai, Risa no Yōsei Densetsu, Shin Onigashima, Super Mario Bros. 2JP, The Legend of Zelda (FDS release), The Mysterious Murasame Castle, Vs. Excitebike, Yūyūki, Zelda II: The Adventure of LinkJP, and more.

The Famicom Disk System's ASIC is an extended audio chip, which supports one channel of single-cycle (6-bit × 64 step) wavetable-lookup synthesis with a built in phase modulator (PM) for sound generation similar to frequency modulation synthesis. Some cartridge conversions of Disk System games have MMCs to replace the audio channel.

AOROM
 Manufacturer: Nintendo
 Games: Battletoads, Wizards & Warriors, Cobra Triangle, Jeopardy!
The A*ROM MMC, named after the AMROM, ANROM, and AOROM cartridge boards that use it, was developed by Chris Stamper of Rare, and manufactured by Nintendo. It is found in games developed by Rare for Nintendo, Tradewest, GameTek, Acclaim, and Milton Bradley. It allows the PRG ROM to be switched in a single 32KB piece and uses CHR RAM for up to 256KB total ROM. Unlike other chips, it uses one screen mirroring.

Third-party chips
Nintendo maintained tight control over internationally-released cartridge hardware and did not allow third parties to use their own PCBs and mappers. This remained the case until late in the NES's commercial lifespan when Nintendo eased up the restrictions. As a result most third party mappers will only be found in Famicom or unlicensed cartridges.

VRC1
 Manufacturer: Konami, Jaleco (SS8805)
 Games: Exciting Boxing, Ganbare Goemon! Karakuri Douchuu, Jajamaru Ninpouchou, King Kong 2: Ikari no Megaton Punch, Moero!!, Junior Basket: Two on Two, Tetsuwan Atom

VRC2
 Manufacturer: Konami
 Games: ContraJP, Tiny Toon AdventuresJP, Akumajō Special: Boku Dracula-kun
The VRC2 is a chip from Konami that allows program ROM to be switched in 8KB banks, and character ROM to be switched in 1KB banks. This MMC has two known revisions: VRC2a and VRC2b.

VRC3
 Manufacturer: Konami
 Games: SalamanderJP
Exclusively used in the Japanese version of Salamander.

VRC4

 Manufacturer: Konami
 Games: Gradius IIJP, Crisis Force, Bio Miracle:Boku tte Upa, Ganbare Goemon Gaiden 2, WaiWai World, WaiWai World 2, Twinbee 3
The VRC4 Chip is similar to the VRC2 chip, other than the VRC4 allowing for 512KB CHR capacity, 2 8KB PRG ROM banking modes and 1 screen mirroring.

VRC5
 Manufacturer: Konami
 Games: Space SchoolJP
Exclusively used in the QTa adapter in Konami's Space School series of educational games.

VRC6

 Manufacturer: Konami
 Games: Akumajō Densetsu, Mōryō Senki MADARA, Esper Dream II
The VRC6 (Virtual Rom Controller) is an advanced MMC chip from Konami, supporting bank switching for both program code and graphics as well as a CPU cycle–based IRQ counter, which can also act as a scanline counter. The chip also contains support for three extra sound channels (two square waves of eight duty cycles each, and one sawtooth wave). It is used in Akumajō Densetsu (the Japanese version of Castlevania III: Dracula's Curse), while the Western version uses the MMC5 from Nintendo. Since the Nintendo Entertainment System does not allow cartridges to add additional sound channels, the Famicom version's soundtrack was reworked to follow those specifications; thus the soundtrack on the Western version is implemented by the five sound channels built into the stock NES.

VRC7

 Manufacturer: Konami, Yamaha
 Games: Lagrange Point, Tiny Toon Adventures 2: Trouble in Wackyland
The VRC7 is an advanced MMC chip from Konami, supporting bank switching and IRQ counting equivalent to the VRC6, and containing a YM2413 derivative providing 6 channels of FM Synthesis audio. This advanced audio is used only in the Famicom game Lagrange Point. The Japanese version of Tiny Toon Adventures 2 uses the VRC7 but not the extended audio.

Namco 163
 Manufacturer: Namco
 Games: Erika to Satoru no Yume Bōken, Final Lap, King of Kings, Mappy Kids, Digital Devil Story: Megami Tensei II, Namco Classic II, Romance of the Three Kingdoms, Romance of the Three Kingdoms II, Yokai Dochuki, Rolling ThunderJP, Top Striker
The 163 has been only used in games exclusive to Japan. Its capabilities were a little better than Nintendo's MMC3. A variant contained extra sound hardware that plays 4-bit wave samples. It supports 1 to 8 extra sound channels, but audible aliasing appears when a sufficiently large number of channels are enabled.

FME-7
 Manufacturer: Sunsoft
 Games: Batman: Return of the Joker, Hebereke, and more.
The FME-7 is a memory mapping circuit developed by Sunsoft for use in NES and Famicom cartridges. It switches program ROM in 8KB banks and switches the character ROM 1KB banks. It also contains hardware to generate IRQ signals after a specified number of CPU clock cycles, thus achieving split-screen effects with minimal use of processing power.

SUNSOFT-4

 Manufacturer: Sunsoft

SUNSOFT 5B
 Manufacturer: Sunsoft
 Games: Gimmick!
This version of the FME-7 contains a version of the widely used Yamaha YM2149.

Unlicensed MMCs
Some individual (homebrew) and unlicensed developers have made custom MMCs for the NES, most of which simply expand the available memory.

228
 Manufacturer: Active Enterprises
 Games: Action 52, Cheetahmen II
228 is a simple bank switching MMC developed for use in the games Action 52 and Cheetahmen II. It does not have a nametable control bit. In the Action 52 multicart, it also contains a small 16-bit register area that contains the old menu selection when exiting a game.

GTROM
 Manufacturer: Membler Industries
GTROM or Cheapocadabra is a self-flashable MMC developed in 2015 for the homebrew market. The board contains 512K of PRG ROM, 16K of CHR ROM, and two LEDs. While the GTROM does not contain PRG RAM, saved games are possible due to PRG ROM being flashable by NES software.

See also
 List of Super NES enhancement chips

References 

Integrated circuits
Memory management